Teatro da Cornucópia is a theatre company in Portugal founded in 1973 by Jorge Silva Melo and Luís Miguel Cintra with the staging of the play The Misanthrope by Molière. The theatre is located at the Teatro do Bairro Alto, Rua Tenente Raul Cascais, Lisbon.

It has presented works by: Sophocles, Plauto, Seneca, Lope de Vega, Calderón de la Barca, Shakespeare, Corneille, Marivaux, Beaumarchais, Hölderlin, Schiller, Strindberg, Ibsen, Chekhov, Gorki, Ostróvski, Pirandello, Brecht, Catherine Dasté, Franz Xaver Kroetz, Michel Deutsch, Odon von Horváth, Georg Büchner, Karl Valentin, Dario Fo, Jean Paul Wenzel, Claudine Fiévet, Heiner Müller, Botho Strauss, William Wycherley, Edward Bond, Lorca, Igor Stravinsky, William Walton, Hans Werner Henze, Samuel Beckett, Joe Orton, Georg Buchner, Peter Handke, Georges Courteline, Genet, Jean-Claude Biette, Gertrude Stein, Lars Norén, Ferenc Molnár, Stig Dagerman, Heinrich von Kleist, Pasolini, R.W. Fassbinder, Christian Dietrich Grabbe, Jakob Lenz, Gil Vicente, Luís de Camões, Francisco de Holanda, António José da Silva, Almeida Garrett, Raul Brandão, Fiama H.P. Brandão, Eduarda Dionísio, Sophia M.B. Andresen, Manuel de Figueiredo, José Meireles and Ruy Belo.

The theatre closed on December 17, 2016.

References

External links
Official site

Theatre companies in Portugal
1973 establishments in Portugal
2016 disestablishments in Portugal